The lesser moorhen (Paragallinula angulata) is a species of bird in the family Rallidae. It is sometimes placed into the genus Gallinula. It is the only member of the genus Paragallinula. 

It is widely spread across Sub-Saharan Africa (excluding Southern Africa and Madagascar).

Taxonomy 
The lesser moorhen was formerly placed in the genus Gallinula, but a 2015 molecular genetic study demonstrated that Gallinula was composed of four distinct lineages. The genus was split into four genera: Gallinula (sensu stricto), Paragallinula, Porphyriops, and Tribonyx. 

P. angulata is the only known species of Paragallinula which makes Paragallinula a monotypic genus.

The name paragallinula comes from the Greek para 'beside' and the genus Gallinula. It is named for its similarity with the members of Gallinula, but it also indicates its unique genetic lineage.

Notes 
Recorded in the Western Palearctic ://www.birdguides.com/articles/lesser-moorhen-in-cape-verde-march-2019

References

External links
 Lesser moorhen - Species text in The Atlas of Southern African Birds

lesser moorhen
Birds of Sub-Saharan Africa
lesser moorhen
Taxonomy articles created by Polbot